A mamelon (from French mamelon, "nipple") is one of three rounded protuberances which are present on the cutting edge of an incisor tooth when it first erupts through the gum. Mamelons' appearance can be smoothed by a dentist if they have not been worn down naturally by biting and eating foods. Mamelons are present on permanent central and lateral incisors. Mamelons are easiest to observe on the maxillary central incisors, and appear as three small prominences on the incisal edge of the tooth. Mamelons are ordinarily of no clinical importance. Usually they are worn off early in the life of the tooth.

References

Parts of tooth